Curtitoma ovalis is a species of sea snail, a marine gastropod mollusk in the family Mangeliidae.

Description
The length of the shell varies between 4.8 mm and 5.5 mm.

The very small shell has a fusiform or subovate shape, with four or five convex whorls, a very short spire, and a large body whorl. The sculpture is very finely cancellated or reticulated. The whorls are usually evenly rounded, moderately convex, but often have a slightly marked, rounded shoulder. The suture is somewhat impressed, and rather oblique. The protoconch is relatively big, with a blunt apex, so that it appears to be obtuse, or rounded, smooth, and glassy. The whole surface below the protoconch is covered by fine, raised, revolving cinguli (raised spiral lines), separated by slight grooves of about the same width, and by equally fine, slightly sinuous, transverse riblets, coincident with the lines of growth, and receding in a distinct curve on the subsutural band. The crossing of these two sets of lines produces a finely cancellated sculpture over the whole surface, but the transverse lines are usually more evident on the convexity of the whorls, while the spiral lines are more conspicuous anteriorly, and on the siphon. The aperture is relatively large, oblong-elliptical, slightly obtusely angled posteriorly. The sinus is shallow, but distinct, with even concave. The outer lip is elsewhere uniformly convex. The siphonal canal is short and broad, not constricted at the base by any incurvature of the outer lip. The columella is strongly concave or excavated, and in the middle, sigmoid anteriorly. The shell is pale greenish white, and covered by a thin epidermis of similar color. The operculum ear is shaped with a central ridge.

Distribution
This species occurs in the bathyal and abyssal parts of the Arctic Ocean (at depths between 557 m and 4734 m), Northwest Atlantic Ocean and off Iceland and Portugal

References

  Friele H. (1877), Preliminary report on the Mollusca from the Norwegian North Atlantic Expedition in 1876; Nyt Magazin for Naturvidenskaberne, 23: 1–10,
 Abbott, R.T. (1974). American Seashells. 2nd ed. Van Nostrand Reinhold: New York, NY (USA). 663 pp.
 Gofas, S.; Le Renard, J.; Bouchet, P. (2001). Mollusca, in: Costello, M.J. et al. (Ed.) (2001). European register of marine species: a check-list of the marine species in Europe and a bibliography of guides to their identification. Collection Patrimoines Naturels, 50: pp. 180–213
 Sysoev A.V. (2014). Deep-sea fauna of European seas: An annotated species check-list of benthic invertebrates living deeper than 2000 m in the seas bordering Europe. Gastropoda. Invertebrate Zoology. Vol.11. No.1: 134–155

External links
  Verrill, A. E. 1882. Catalogue of marine Mollusca added to the fauna of the New England region, during the past ten years. Transactions of the Connecticut Academy of Arts and Sciences 5: 451–587, pls. 42–44, 57–58
  Tucker, J.K. 2004 Catalog of recent and fossil turrids (Mollusca: Gastropoda). Zootaxa 682: 1–1295.
 Bouchet, Philippe, and Anders Warén. "The abyssal molluscan fauna of the Norwegian Sea and its relation to other faunas." Sarsia 64.3 (1979): 211–243.

ovalis
Gastropods described in 1877